Sergei Prokofiev's Piano Sonata No. 6 in A major, Op. 82 (1940) is a sonata for solo piano, the first of the Three War Sonatas. The sonata was first performed on 8 April 1940, in Moscow, with the composer at the piano.

Movements
Allegro moderato (in A major)
Allegretto (in E major)
Tempo di valzer lentissimo (in C major)
Vivace (in A minor, ending in A major)

1. Allegro moderato
The first movement introduces the main motto, where the melody is played in minor thirds and parallel major thirds. This makes the movement tonally unstable, since both A major and A minor are established. Also, the motto is accompanied by a rising and falling augmented 4th between notes A and D#, creating sharp dissonances.  Thus, it already introduces the uncertainty of the work. The greater part of it is dominated by grinding dissonances and frequent modulation, further increasing the despair of the work. Throughout most of the piece, there is a lack of key signature.

2. Allegretto
The second movement has been described as having a march-like sound with staccato chords. There is also a very bouncy, humorous, and jaunty character to the outer sections of the piece. The middle section is more melodic and a little more pensive and mysterious.

3. Tempo di valzer lentissimo
The third movement is similar to a waltz, slower and romantic in the outer sections, but with an stormy, bell-like middle section.

4. Vivace
The closing movement is a headlong rondo. The middle section recalls the opening motto from the first movement, albeit with the first note missing. In the extremely virtuosic coda, the motto, transformed and abbreviated, is hammered out violently amid swirls of harried notes, and then played in full in rapid, stammering descending chords, as if to proclaim a most Pyrrhic victory.

References

External links
Prokofiev's Sonata No. 6 on Classical Connect.

Video - Prokofiev Piano Sonata No 6 - Complete (30:34).

Compositions by Sergei Prokofiev
Piano sonatas by Sergei Prokofiev
20th-century classical music
1940 compositions
Compositions in A major
Piano compositions in the 20th century